Will Hopkins (birth unknown – death unknown) was a Welsh professional rugby league footballer who played in the 1900s.

International honours
Hopkins won a cap for Wales while at Aberdare in the 7-31 defeat by England at Wheater's Field, Salford on Monday 28 December 1908.

References

Aberdare RLFC players
Place of birth missing
Place of death missing
Rugby league halfbacks
Wales national rugby league team players
Welsh rugby league players
Year of birth missing
Year of death missing